The Clock Strikes Twelve is a collection of stories by author H. Russell Wakefield. It was released in 1946 and was the first collection of the author's stories to be published by Arkham House.  It was published in an edition of 4,040 copies.

Contents

The Clock Strikes Twelve contains the following tales:

 "Why I Write Ghost Stories"
 "Into Outer Darkness"
 "The Alley"
 "Jay Walkers"
 "Ingredient X"
 "“I Recognised the Voice”"
 "Farewell Performance"
 "Not Quite Cricket"
 "In Collaboration"
 "A Stitch in Time"
 "Lucky's Grove"
 "Red Feathers"
 "Happy Ending?"
 "The First Sheaf"
 "Masrur"
 "A Fishing Story"
 "Used Car"
 "Death of a Poacher"
 "Knock! Knock! Who's There?"

References

1946 short story collections
Horror short story collections
Fantasy short story collections
Short stories by H. Russell Wakefield
Arkham House books